Johan Aantjes (born May 6, 1958, in Utrecht) is a former water polo player from the Netherlands, who finished in sixth position with the Dutch National Men's Team at the 1984 Summer Olympics in Los Angeles, California. Later on, from 1999 until 2003, Aantjes was the head coach of the Dutch Men's Squad. He resigned in the spring of 2003 after the Netherlands finished in a disappointing eleventh position at the European Championships 2003 in Slovenia, but returned to the job in 2006.

References

External links 
 Dutch Olympic Committee

1958 births
Living people
Dutch male water polo players
Olympic water polo players of the Netherlands
Water polo players at the 1984 Summer Olympics
Sportspeople from Utrecht (city)
20th-century Dutch people